The 2015–16 Louisiana Tech Bulldogs basketball team represented Louisiana Tech University during the 2015–16 NCAA Division I men's basketball season. The Bulldogs, led by first year head coach Eric Konkol, played their home games at the Thomas Assembly Center and were members of Conference USA. They finished the season 23–10, 12–6 in C-USA play to finish in three way tie for third place. They lost in the quarterfinals of the C-USA tournament to Old Dominion. They were invited to the inaugural Vegas 16, which only had eight teams, where they lost in the quarterfinals to East Tennessee State.

Previous season 
The Bulldogs finished the 2014–15 season 27–9, 15–3 in C-USA play to finish as regular season C-USA champions. They advanced to the semifinals of the C-USA tournament where they lost to UAB. As a regular season conference champion who failed to win their conference tournament, they received an automatic bid to the National Invitation Tournament where they defeated Central Michigan in the first round and Texas A&M in the second round before losing in the quarterfinals to Temple.

Departures

Incoming Transfers

Recruiting class of 2015

Roster

Schedule

|-
!colspan=9 style="background:#; color:#;"| Exhibition

|-
!colspan=9 style="background:#; color:#;"| Non-conference regular season

|-
!colspan=12 style="background:#;| Conference USA regular season

|-
!colspan=9 style="background:#;| Conference USA tournament

"background:#; color:#;"
|-
!colspan=12 style="background:#;| Vegas 16

References

Louisiana Tech Bulldogs basketball seasons
Louisiana Tech
Louisiana Tech Bulldogs men's b
Louisiana Tech Bulldogs men's b
Louisiana Tech